Legwork is an album by American jazz flautist Jeremy Steig released on the Solid State label in 1970.

Reception 

Allmusic's Wilson McCloy said: "Legwork has long been a "rare-groove" collectors' favorite, and for good reason. The versatile Eddie Gomez lays down funky and compelling grooves throughout on acoustic bass while not hesitating to swing when necessary, walking his basslines over Don Alias' sometimes sparse yet authoritative drumming. Steig utilizes a seemingly endless array of flute techniques, soaring above and interacting with the rhythm section. On several tracks he uses overdubbing effectively, calling and responding to his own lines. The whole album is truly eclectic, spanning funk, exotic ostinatos, blues, Miles Davis' "Nardis," and freer excursions ... Legwork remains one of the high points of Steig's recorded work".

Track listing
All compositions by Jeremy Steig except where noted
 "Howlin' for Judy" – 4:38
 "Permutations" (Steig, Eddie Gómez) – 8:00
 "Hot-Head" (Steig, Gómez, Sam Brown, Don Alias) – 8:50
 "Alias (a li' as)" (Steig, Gómez, Alias) – 4:18
 "Nardis" (Miles Davis) – 11:02
 "Piece of Freedom" (Steig, Gómez) – 6:02

Personnel
Jeremy Steig – flute
Eddie Gómez − bass, electric upright bass
Don Alias – drums
Sam Brown – guitar on "Hot-Head"
Technical
Frank Gauna - art direction
Jeremy Steig - artwork

References

1970 albums
Albums produced by Sonny Lester
Jazz-funk albums
Jeremy Steig albums
Solid State Records (jazz label) albums